Binaural recording is a method of recording sound that uses two microphones, arranged with the intent to create a 3-D stereo sound sensation for the listener of actually being in the room with the performers or instruments. This effect is often created using a technique known as dummy head recording, wherein a mannequin head is fitted with a microphone in each ear. Binaural recording is intended for replay using headphones and will not translate properly over stereo speakers. This idea of a three-dimensional or "internal" form of sound has also translated into useful advancement of technology in many things such as stethoscopes creating "in-head" acoustics and IMAX movies being able to create a three-dimensional acoustic experience.

The term "binaural" has frequently been confused as a synonym for the word "stereo", due in part to systematic misuse in the mid-1950s by the recording industry, as a marketing buzzword. Conventional stereo recordings do not factor in natural ear spacing or "head shadow" of the head and ears, since these things happen naturally as a person listens, generating interaural time differences (ITDs) and interaural level differences (ILDs) specific to their listening position. Because loudspeaker-crosstalk with conventional stereo interferes with binaural reproduction (i.e., because the sound from each channel's speaker is heard by both ears rather than only by the ear on the corresponding side, as would be the case with headphones), either headphones are required, or crosstalk cancellation of signals intended for loudspeakers such as Ambiophonics is required. For listening using conventional speaker-stereo, or MP3 players, a pinna-less dummy head may be preferable for quasi-binaural recordings such as the sphere microphone or Ambiophone. As a general rule, for true binaural results, an audio recording and reproduction system chain, from the microphone to the listener's brain, should contain one and only one set of pinnae (preferably the listener's own), and one head-shadow.

History
The history of binaural recording goes back to 1881. The first binaural unit, the théâtrophone, was invented by Clément Ader. It consisted of an array of carbon telephone microphones installed along the front edge of the Opera Garnier. The signal was sent to subscribers through the telephone system, and required that they wear a special headset, which had a tiny speaker for each ear.

In 1978, Lou Reed released the first commercially produced binaural pop record, Street Hassle, a combination of live and studio recordings.

Binaural stayed in the background due to the expensive, specialized equipment required for quality recordings, and the requirement of headphones for proper reproduction. Particularly in pre-Walkman days, most consumers considered headphones an inconvenience, and were only interested in recordings that could be listened to on a home stereo system or in automobiles. Lastly, the types of things that can be recorded do not have a typically high market value. Studio recordings would have little to benefit from using a binaural set up, beyond natural cross-feed, as the spatial quality of the studio would not be very dynamic and interesting. Recordings that are of interest are live orchestral performances, and ambient "environmental" recordings of city sounds, nature, and other such subject matters.

The modern era has seen a resurgence of interest in binaural, partially due to the widespread availability of headphones, cheaper methods of recording and the general increased commercial interest in 360° audio technology.

The online ASMR community is another movement that has widely employed binaural recordings.

The rise of Dolby Atmos and other 360° audio film technology in relation to commercial entertainment has seen a rise in popularity of the use of binaural simulation. This is with the purpose of fully adapting the 360° soundtrack for headphones and earphones. Users can ostensibly watch 360° films and music with the immersive surround sound experience remaining intact despite using just the two headset speakers. Notably, any full 360° multi-channel soundtrack is automatically converted to simulated binaural audio when listened to with headphones.

Recording techniques

With a simple recording method, two microphones are placed 18 cm (7") apart facing away from each other. This method will not create a real binaural recording. The distance and placement roughly approximate the position of an average human's ear canals, but that is not all that is needed. More elaborate techniques exist in pre-packaged forms. A typical binaural recording unit has two high-fidelity microphones mounted in a dummy head, inset in ear-shaped molds to fully capture all of the audio frequency adjustments (known as head-related transfer functions (HRTFs) in the psychoacoustic research community) that happen naturally as sound wraps around the human head and is "shaped" by the form of the outer and inner ear.

Re-recording techniques 
The technique of binaural re-recording is simple but has not been well established. It follows the same principles of Worldizing, a technique used by film sound designers in which sound is played over a loudspeaker in a real-world location and then re-recorded, taking along all the aspects and characteristics of the real-world environment with it.

Using space to manipulate a sound and then re-recording it has been done through the use of echo chambers in recording studios for many years. In 1959, an echo chamber was famously used by Irving Townsend during the post-production process of Miles Davis's 1959 album Kind of Blue.  "[the effect of the echo chamber on Kind of Blue is] just a bit of sweetening. At 30th Street, a line was run from the mixing console down into a low-ceilinged, concrete basement room—about 12 by 15 feet in size—anywhere we set up a speaker and a good omnidirectional microphone."

In binaural re-recording, a binaural microphone is used to record content being played over a multi-channel speaker set-up. The binaural head, or microphone, is therefore theoretically making a recording of how humans will hear multi-channel content. The soundtrack to a film, for example, will be recorded by the binaural microphone with all the environmental cues of the given location, as well as reverberations, including those commonly created by the human torso (assuming a HATS model is used). This method, like certain binaural recordings made with a Neumann KU 100.

Using an MRI scanner, Brüel & Kjær and DTU collected the geometries of a large population of human ears. By capturing the full ear canal geometry including the bony part adjoining the eardrum was, this data was post-processed to determine the average human ear canal geometry. Based on this, High-frequency Head and Torso Simulator (HATS) Type 5128, creates a very realistic reproduction of the acoustic properties, covering the full audible frequency range (up to 20 kHz).

Playback

There are some complications with the playback of binaural recordings through headphones. The sound that is picked up by a microphone placed in or at the entrance of the ear channel has a frequency spectrum that is very different from the one that would be picked up by a free-standing microphone. The diffuse-field head-transfer function (HRTF), that is, the frequency response at the eardrum averaged for sounds coming from all possible directions, is quite grotesque, with peaks and dips exceeding 10 dB. Frequencies from around 2 kHz to 5 kHz in particular are strongly amplified as compared to free field presentation.

Known issues

Timbral issues  

In January 2012 BBC R&D worked together with BBC Radio 4 to produce a binaural production of Private Peaceful, the book by Michael Morpurgo. The 88 minute dramatization featured a reproduction of a 5.1 speaker system, and had 4 variations. At the start of each variation, the listener would hear a series of test signals allowing for a choice of which version gives the listener the best spatial experience. By doing this, BBC R&D have accepted that there will be variations on the success of the binaural reproduction, and therefore provided different mixes based on different sets of HRTF data. The release of Private Peaceful had an accompanying survey which all listeners were asked to complete. It asked questions about the success that the binaural reproduction had with the listeners and which version (1-4) the listener thought was most successful.

During an interview with Chris Pike from BBC R&D in September 2012, Pike stated that "you may get good spatial impression but timbral coloration is often an issue". The issue of timbral coloration is mentioned in a large amount of spatial enhancement research and is sometimes seen as the outcome of the misuse or insufficient amount of HRTF data when reproducing binaural audio for example, or the fact that the end-user simply will not respond well to the collected HRTF data. Francis Rumsey states in the 2011 article "Whose head is it anyway?"  that "badly implemented HRTFs can give rise to poor timbral quality, poor externalisation, and a host of other unwanted results". Getting the HRTF data correct is a key point in making the final product a success, and possibly by making the HRTF data as extensive as possible, there will be less room for error such as timbral issues. The HRTFs used for Private Peaceful were designed by measuring impulse responses in a reverberant room, done so to capture a sense of space, but is not very external and there are obvious timbral issues as pointed out by Pike.

Juha Merimaa from Sennheiser Research Laboratories found that using HRTF filters to reduce timbral issues did not affect the spatial localisation previously achieved using the data when tested on a panel of listeners. This explains that there are ways of reducing the effects of timbral issues on audio that have been processed with HRTF data, but this does mean further EQ manipulation of the audio. If this route is to be further explored, researchers will have to be happy with the fact that the audio is being manipulated in great amounts to achieve a greater sense of spatial awareness, and that this further manipulation will cause irreversible changes to the audio, something content creators may not be happy with. Consideration will have to be taken into how much manipulation is appropriate and to what extent, if any, will this affect the end users experience.

Timbral issues related to headphones 
Ideal listening conditions will most likely be experienced with headphones designed and calibrated to give an as flat frequency response as possible in order to reduce colouration of the audio the user is listening to. In most circumstances this has not seemed enough of a problem for end-users to make an investment into headphones that will allow them to hear audio exactly how the creator of the content intended, and will instead continue to use bundled headphones, or in some cases make investments into headphones endorsed and branded by certain artists. As previously discussed, there are issues of timbral effects present while using BRIR and HRTF data to create spatially improved audio, techniques used by Chris Pike and BBC R&D. The results experienced timbral issues and therefore this method may not yet be a successful way of creating spatially enhanced audio for headphones, but these timbral issues are also experienced with headphone choice. "[Are timbral issues brought about by the use of BRIR and HRFT data] any worse than the difference between some cheap headphones that you get with an mp3 player versus some nice Sennheisers".

Commonly used binaural microphones

Brüel & Kjær Head and Torso Simulators (HATS) 
Designed to be used in-situ electroacoustics tests on, for example, telephone handsets, headsets, audio conference devices, microphones, headphones, hearing aids and hearing protectors.

Neumann KU 100  
The Neumann KU 100 is a dummy head microphone used to record in binaural stereo. "It resembles the human head and has two microphone capsules built into the ears". The Neumann is a commonly used binaural microphone and features use by BBC R&D teams.

G.R.A.S. Head & Torso Simulator KEMAR (HATS)  
KEMAR was initially invented in collaboration with the audiological industry for the use of hearing aid development, and is still the de facto standard for this industry – however since then the usage of KEMAR has spread into a multitude of other industries like: telecommunications, hearing protection test, automotive development etc. KEMAR is designed using large statistical research to as close to the average human measurements as possible. The KEMAR model is also the only microphone on this list to feature a torso model. Torso reflections have been seen to be a considerable contributor to creating a successful binaural recording.

3Dio range  
The 3Dio range of binaural microphones feature two silicone ear (pinna) moulds separated by —close to average distance between human ears. Microphones are placed inside the ears range from Primo EM172 in the Free Space and Free Space XLR models, to DPA 4060s in the Pro II model. The 3Dio range is considerably cheaper than the Neumann KU 100 for example and therefore used more on a consumer to prosumer level. The main difference with the 3Dio models compared to the KEMAR or KU 100 is the absence of a head model. The 3Dio relies entirely in the use on pinna moulds to achieve a binaural effect from the stereo recording.

Sound.Codes Kaan 
Kaan is a DIY binaural microphone for sound artist. It is a 3D printed model averaging human ear canal to average the resonating frequency inherently present in every human. Because of the form factor and weight it makes it easy to sample environments which would be otherwise harder to with other Microphones along with ADC and recorders.

Microphones are placed exactly at the ear drum using Primo EM 172 and 235mm being the average earlobe to earlobe distance. The sigmoid form in the canal of Kaan makes up for the missing head to a greater extent.

Sound Professionals SP-TFB-2  
An in-ear wearable stereo microphone used like earphones, placed inside the human pinna. This microphone uses the user's pinna to create the binaural effect.

ZiBionic 
The ZiBionic One is a binaural microphone for ASMR recording. The specific shapes and sizes of a binaural recording device "affect the behaviour - such as absorption, transmission, reflection, interference - of acoustic waves". Similarly to 3Dio, ZiBionic has no head model, but its head shadow and body shape was bent in such a way that ASMR recording technics (close range sound source, for example whispering) can be detected more effectively with the two capsules inside the ear-shaped microphones.

Hooke Verse 
The Hooke Verse is a relatively newer binaural device that is an in-ear wearable set of microphones that connects to recording devices utilizing Bluetooth with lossless recording.  The codec developed allows the user to capture audio along with video. Additionally, the device utilizes microphone windscreens to cut down on wind noise, a common problem with wearable devices and smart phones. "Smartphone manufacturers face a double problem with wind noise. Not only is turbulence present in the airflow at large, but the rectangular shape of a smartphone produces  eddies around itself."

See also

 Binaural beats
 Binaural fusion
 Dynamic Binaural recording
 Franssen effect
 Holophonics
 Precedence effect

References

Further reading

External links

 Examples of 3D binaural recordings

 
Autonomous sensory meridian response
Microphone practices
Sound recording technology
Stereophonic sound